Harold and the Purple Crayon is an upcoming American film directed by Carlos Saldanha, in his live-action directorial debut. It is based on the 1955 children’s book of the same name written by Crockett Johnson, and will star Zachary Levi, Lil Rel Howery, Zooey Deschanel, Ravi Patel, Camille Guaty, Tanya Reynolds, and Pete Gardner. The film also marks Batu Sener’s theatrical debut as film composer, after collaborating with John Powell on additional music for many of the latter’s films.

The film is scheduled to be released in theaters in the United States on June 30, 2023 by Sony Pictures Releasing, via its Columbia Pictures label.

Cast 
 Zachary Levi
 Lil Rel Howery 
 Zooey Deschanel
 Ravi Patel
 Camille Guaty
 Tanya Reynolds
 Pete Gardner

Production

Early attempts 
In 1992, John B. Carls formed the family-film production company, Wild Things Productions, with Maurice Sendak, writer and illustrator of Where the Wild Things Are. They acquired rights to other children's books, including Harold and the Purple Crayon and whose author Johnson, was a mentor to Sendak. Sendak and Denise Di Novi were producers. About 1994, Michael Tolkin was brought in to write the script and Henry Selick was to direct, but Selick moved on to James and the Giant Peach for Walt Disney Pictures. Carls picked Spike Jonze to develop the film, a combination of live action and animation. A budget of $25 million to almost $50 million was mentioned in the press. David O. Russell was brought in to help with rewrites. Multiple screenplays, casting, storyboards, and animation work started but Jonze had to abandoned the project after more than a year working on it when new management at TriStar Pictures stopped it, two months before principal photography.

In February 2010, it was reported that Columbia Pictures, Sony Pictures Animation and Will Smith's Overbrook Entertainment were developing a CGI-animated film adaptation of Harold and the Purple Crayon, to be produced by Smith and James Lassiter, and written by Josh Klausner. In December 2016, it was reported that the film would also be written by Dallas Clayton. The film would still be produced by Columbia Pictures and distributed by Sony Pictures Releasing.

Resurgence 
On February 1, 2021, it was reported that Zachary Levi would star in the film, though it was not stated what role he would play. It was also announced that Carlos Saldanha was attached to direct the new film, and that David Guion and Michael Handelman replaced Klausner and Clayton as screenwriters, with John Davis producing under his Davis Entertainment banner. Lil Rel Howery was announced as part of the cast on January 11, 2022. Zooey Deschanel and Ravi Patel were added in February 2022. Camille Guaty was cast on March 1, 2022. Tanya Reynolds and Pete Gardner joined in May 2022.

Around the beginning of 2022, live-action filming was taking place in the Atlanta, Georgia area. Little has been announced about the plot or what roles the actors play.

Music 
Batu Sener is composing the film's score.

Release 
The film is currently scheduled to be released in theaters on June 30, 2023. It was previously scheduled to be released on January 27, 2023.

Marketing 
Sony Pictures showed footage from the film as part of an upcoming releases sizzle reel at CinemaCon in April 2022.

References

External links 
 
 

Upcoming films
2023 films
Films based on children's books
Films shot in Atlanta
Films shot in Georgia (U.S. state)
Davis Entertainment films
2020s English-language films
Films directed by Carlos Saldanha